Daviesia alata is a species of flowering plant in the family Fabaceae and is endemic to south-eastern New South Wales. It is a prostrate to low-lying shrub with winged branchlets that are triangular in cross-section, phyllodes reduced to scales, and orange, red, yellow and maroon flowers.

Description
The branchlets are triangular in cross-section, winged and dark green.

Taxonomy
Daviesia alata was first formally described in 1808 by James Edward Smith in Rees's Cyclopædia from specimens collected "near Port Jackson".

Distribution and habitat
This pea grows in heath and forest on the coast and ranges of south-eastern New South Wales between Nelson Bay, the Budawangs and the Blue Mountains.

References 

alata
Flora of New South Wales
Plants described in 1808
Taxa named by James Edward Smith